Patrick O'Sullivan is an Irish-British scholar and author of major works in the field of Military geography.

He is the author of the oft-cited texts The Geography of Warfare and The Geography of War in the Post-Cold War World. Though the former was published in 1983 and the latter in 2001, these works remain the seminal texts of Military geography from a civilian publisher, due in large part to the present lack of interest in the subfield among geographers, aside from a small handful who critique militarization through critical theory.

In his 1986 book Geopolitics, Patrick O'Sullivan makes a geographically-based case against the proliferation of nuclear weapons during the Cold War, arguing that nuclear weapons pose a threat largely because they reduce the significance of both physical distance and national borders, which would otherwise function as a deterrent to the likelihood of direct military engagement.

Patrick O'Sullivan is also known to a lesser extent for his work on the social scientific study of railway transportation in Britain as well as an autoethnographic Cultural Geography essay discussing the relevance of expatriate identity.

Starting in 1994, he taught at Florida State University, and now holds the status of professor emeritus. His academic writing incorporates elements of a regional geography focus with aspects of behavioral geography, and often takes a similarly explanatory and analytical approach to the Realist school of International Relations' focus on the behavior and motivations of states, though from a more geopolitical angle and with a greater focus on the decisions of individual leaders.

Unlike many other authors and scholars of human geography, his work is not as overtly hostile to environmental determinism or environmental possibilism.

References

Year of birth missing (living people)
Living people
British geographers
Alumni of the London School of Economics
Florida State University faculty
Military geographers